Bonin  is a village in the administrative district of Gmina Manowo, within Koszalin County, West Pomeranian Voivodeship, in north-western Poland.
In Bonin is placed Department of Potato Protection and Seed Science, formerly Potato Research Institute, now part of Plant Breeding and Acclimatization Institute.

The village has a population of 1,300.

You can travel there with Koszalin's 8 bus.

References

Bonin